The 2007 Acura Classic was a women's tennis tournament played on outdoor hard courts in San Diego in the United States which was part of Tier I of the 2007 WTA Tour. It was the 29th edition of the tournament and was held from July 30 through August 5, 2007. First-seeded Maria Sharapova won the singles title and earned $181,980 first-prize money as well as 430 ranking points.

Finals

Singles

 Maria Sharapova defeated  Patty Schnyder, 6–2, 3–6, 6–0
 It was Sharapova's only title of the year and the 16th of her career.

Doubles

 Cara Black /  Liezel Huber defeated  Victoria Azarenka /  Anna Chakvetadze 7–5, 6–4
 It was Black's 6th title of the year and the 43rd of her career. It was Huber's 6th title of the year and the 21st of her career.

External links 
 ITF tournament edition details
 Tournament draws

Acura Classic
Southern California Open
Acura Classic
Toshiba Classic
2007 in American tennis